Samara Airport may refer to:

 Carrillo Airport, in Costa Rica
 Kurumoch International Airport, in Samara Oblast, Russia
 Samara Airport (Ethiopia), in Semera, Afar Region, Ethiopia